Glady is an unincorporated community in Randolph County, West Virginia, United States. Glady had a post office, which closed on May 14, 2011.

The community was named for the glades along the Glady Fork River, near the original town site.

Climate
The climate in this area has mild differences between highs and lows, and there is adequate rainfall year-round.  According to the Köppen Climate Classification system, Glady has a marine west coast climate, abbreviated "Cfb" on climate maps.

References

Unincorporated communities in Randolph County, West Virginia
Unincorporated communities in West Virginia